Fat Buddies is a 2018 Chinese action comedy film directed by Bao Bei'er and produced by Abe Kwong Man-Wai and Peggy Lee. The film stars Bao Bei'er, Wen Zhang, Clara Lee, and Xu Juncong. It was scheduled for release on September 30, 2018, in China. The film is the directorial debut from popular Chinese actor Bao Bei'er.

Plot
The film revolves around a pair of big-boned, bumbling cops who find themselves at the heart of a drug trafficking case. The agent “J” (Zhang Wen) was shot in the head during an A-level mission, causing damage to the intracranial hypothalamus. During the period of rehabilitating, J gradually became an obese man of three hundred pounds and suffered from severe narcolepsy, but J still considered himself a competent agent. Finally, J received the task again and went to Japan to retrieve confidential documents. After the file was obtained, J arbitrarily opened the file and decided to continue the task of hiding the organization for the organization, but he fainted in the izakaya. (The following text was removed due to improper English language translation)

Cast
 Bao Bei'er as Hao Yingjun ("Handsome Hao"), a Sino-Japanese big-boned security guard at Northern Kanto General Hospital who helps Agent J in the mission to retrieve an important document.
 Wen Zhang as Jia Jengjun/Agent J, a superspy that is considered the best in the world and is sent to Japan to retrieve an important document.
 Clara Lee as Kin Shiyurin, the hot and young Japanese wife of Handsome Hao who works as a nurse at the same hospital as him.
 Xu Juncong as F, one of top enforcers of Ma Tianyou
 Zeng Yijun as K, one of top enforcers of Ma Tianyou
 Zhang Menglu
 Guo Jingfei as Ma Tianyou, a powerful magnate and philanthropist which at the same time is a dangerous big-time drug-dealer
 Yasuaki Kurata as Northern Kanto General Hospital dean.
 Ryu Kohata as an unnamed Yakuza boss.
 Qi Yuwu as Qi
 Manfred Wong
 Song Jia
 Li Jiaqi

Production
Fat Buddies marks Bao Bei'er's debut as director. He also stars in it.

Shooting began on September 23, 2017 in Japan and then took place in Arxan and Beijing. The film wrapped on December 19 of that same year.

Release
The film premiered in Beijing on September 26, 2018.

On June 26, 2018, the producers announced that the film was scheduled for release on September 30, 2018.

References

External links
 
 

2018 films
2010s Mandarin-language films
Chinese action comedy films
2018 action comedy films
Films shot in Beijing
Films shot in Japan
Films set in Japan
Films set in Tokyo
Japan in non-Japanese culture